"I Told You So" is a song written and recorded by American country music singer Randy Travis from his 1987 album, Always & Forever. It reached number one on the U.S. Billboard and Canadian RPM country singles charts in June 1988. Travis had first recorded it on his 1983 album Live at the Nashville Palace under his stage name "Randy Ray". It became a local hit and one of his most requested songs at the club. In 2007, the song was covered by Carrie Underwood on her album Carnival Ride. Her version was released in February 2009 and was re-recorded and re-released in March as a duet with Travis. Underwood's and Travis's duet peaked at number two on the U.S. country charts in 2009.

Content
"I Told You So" is a mid-tempo in which the narrator poses a hypothetical situation, asking how his lover would react if he said he wanted to come back home. He asks if she would say that she loves him, or "simply laugh at [him] and say 'I told you so'" because she has found someone else.

Randy Travis version
Travis first recorded this for his 1983 "Live at the Nashville Palace" under this stage name at the time "Randy 
Ray".  It was a local hit for him.  Travis re-recorded it for his Always & Forever and released it as a single. His rendition was a Number One hit on the Billboard country charts, peaking in June 1988 and spending two weeks at that position.

Randy Travis later recollected on Twitty's response to the song's popularity. "We were working shows with Conway after it was a #1 song for us, and he remembered it; and for a while every time Lib (Travis' manager and later wife) would walk up to him, she'd just say "I Told You So." It got to the point that every time he'd see her coming he'd say "I don't want to hear it."

Carrie Underwood version

Carrie Underwood released a cover version of the song on her 2007 album, Carnival Ride; it was the fifth and final single released from the album. Her version of the song was featured on the album Now That's What I Call Country Volume 2. Underwood's version has been certified Platinum by the RIAA.

Critical reception
Matt Bjorke of Roughstock called the song "very much a welcomed addition to the charts." He also states that Underwood may "'over sing' the title a bit in the chorus", but "the rest of the song is no doubt her best and truest country single to date." Kevin J. Coyne of Country Universe gave the duet version of the song an A, saying even though these voices are far too strong for one to blend into the background of the other, the soft purity of Underwood’s voice perfectly complements the ragged twang of Travis’s ragged vocal.

Engine 145 critic Brady Vercher gave Underwood's rendition a "thumbs down" rating, saying "When she delivers the chorus she’s just a woman singing a song. Although technically proficient, it’s not very moving."

Music video
A music video for the single was released February 12, 2009 on CMT.com.  It consists of Underwood performing the song at the Grand Ole Opry in a short, black dress.  Before the performance, she states that "I Told You So" has always been "one of [her] favorites growing up".  After the performance, Randy Travis comes out from the back of the stage and compliments Underwood.  He said he was going to perform that song that night, but after hearing Underwood, he decided not to. He told her that the song is "far better suited" for Underwood's vocals than his own.

Duet version
A duet version of "I Told You So" featuring Underwood and Travis was released on March 17, 2009 to country radio airwaves. A digital single of the recording was made available for sale online to coincide with their American Idol performance on March 18, 2009. From the chart week of March 28, 2009 on, the song was credited to Underwood and Travis and marks Travis' first Top 40 single on the country charts since "Three Wooden Crosses" in 2002.
The duet version won Underwood and Travis a Grammy Award for Best Country Collaboration with Vocals at the 52nd Grammy Awards.

Performances
Celebrating the Grand Ole Opry Week on the eighth season of American Idol and as Travis being their mentor, Underwood and Travis performed their duet for the first time live and on television. On April 5, 2009, she again performed this song at the 2009 Academy of Country Music Awards where she won her very first honor as ACM Entertainer of the Year.

Charts
Travis' version was released in 1988 and peaked at number one on the Hot Country Songs in June of that year and spending two weeks at that position. Underwood's version of the song debuted on the Hot Country Songs chart at number 38 for the week January 19, 2009, two weeks before its release date. On the issue date April 4, 2009, the song rose 48 positions from number fifty-seven to number nine on the Billboard Hot 100, making it Underwood's fourth Top 10 on the chart, and Travis' highest Hot 100 peak. With a peak of number two on the country charts, it became Underwood's second single to not reach number one along "Don't Forget to Remember Me" and "Mama's Song" which also both peaked at number two in 2006 and 2011 respectively, breaking a string of six consecutive country number one hits. As of January 2013, the single was certified Platinum, according to RIAA and has sold 1,089,000 copies as of November 2015

Randy Travis version

Year-end charts

Carrie Underwood and Randy Travis duet version

Year-end charts

Certifications

Release history

Awards

Randy Travis

1989 American Music Awards

|-
| align="center"|1989 ||align="center"| "I Told You So" ||align="center"| Country Single of the Year ||

Carrie Underwood and Randy Travis

2009 Country Music Association Awards

|-
| align="center"|2009 ||align="center"| "I Told You So" ||align="center"| Musical Event of the Year ||

52nd Grammy Awards

|-
| align="center"|2010 ||align="center"| "I Told You So" ||align="center"| Best Country Collaboration with Vocals ||

2010 Academy of Country Music Awards

|-
| align="center"|2010 ||align="center"| "I Told You So" ||align="center"| Vocal Event of the Year ||

References

1988 singles
2009 singles
Randy Travis songs
Carrie Underwood songs
Male–female vocal duets
Country ballads
Songs written by Randy Travis
Song recordings produced by Kyle Lehning
Song recordings produced by Mark Bright (record producer)
Warner Records Nashville singles
Arista Nashville singles
1980s ballads
1987 songs